Letter from Home is the sixth studio album by the Pat Metheny Group. It was released in 1989 by Geffen Records. In 1990, the album won the Grammy Award for Best Jazz Fusion Performance. It was certified gold by the RIAA on July 23, 1998.

The album marked the return of Pedro Aznar, who became a member of the Group on the album First Circle. It also featured a reemphasis on increased instrumental diversity and was a huge commercial success, comfortably making the Top 200 album chart at Billboard magazine. "Slip Away" was, as Metheny put it, "extraordinarily successful, one of the most successful individual tunes that we've ever made." He said that it contains an ideal melodic durability.

Track listing

Personnel
 Pat Metheny – acoustic and electric guitars, 12-string guitar, soprano guitar, tiple, guitar synthesizer, Synclavier
 Lyle Mays – piano, organ, accordion, trumpet, Synclavier
 Steve Rodby – acoustic and electric bass
 Paul Wertico – drums, caja, percussion
 Pedro Aznar – voice, guitar, marimba, vibraphone, sax, charango, melodica, pan pipe, percussion
 Armando Marçal – percussion

Charts

Awards
Grammy Awards

References

Pat Metheny albums
1989 albums
Geffen Records albums
Grammy Award for Best Jazz Fusion Performance